Ninaithale Inikkum is a 2009 Indian Tamil-language drama film directed by G. N. R. Kumaravelan. It is a remake of the 2006 Malayalam film Classmates. Prithviraj reprises his role from the original film, the film co-starred Shakthi Vasu, Priyamani, Karthik Kumar, Anuja Iyer, Vishnu Priyan, K. Bhagyaraj and Manobala. The soundtrack was composed by Vijay Antony.

Ninaithale Inikkum was released on 4 September 2009 and was a commercial success at the box office. The film was produced by Gemini Film Circuit and distributed by Sun Pictures. This title was taken from a 1979 Tamil film.

Plot
Shiva (Prithviraj) is an energetic, enthusiastic college student. Being short-tempered, he gets easily provoked by the rich, proud Vasu (Karthik Kumar) and his sneering attitude. From glares and snarls to punches and fights, Vasu and Shiva do it all, even for unreasonable, petty things. Shakthi (Shakthi Vasu) stops their quarrels before they injure each other very badly. As he is friendly, kindhearted, and cool-headed, Shakthi tries to bring Shiva and Vasu together on friendly terms, but in vain. Shiva, Shakthi, and their faithful friend Bala (Vishnu Priyan) stay together through thick and thin and are always ready to voice out their views on behalf of those who stay in the hostel in the college. Shakthi’s father (Bhagyaraj) often visits his son in the hostel and is like a father to all of Shakthi’s friends. Meera (Priyamani), the daughter of an MLA, nurtures a soft corner for Shiva. She is brave enough to stand up to him and check him when he throws unnecessary tantrums. Shalini (Anuja Iyer), Meera’s friend, is a shy, reserved Muslim girl from a very strict family background. She is often preoccupied with her own thoughts. Karthik (Lollu Sabha Jeeva) is a total showoff who tries to humiliate Shiva and Shakthi but ends up making a fool of himself.

The movie begins on an aeroplane as Shiva (a mature-looking Prithviraj, with a French beard and rimless spectacles) heads back to his college to meet his friends. With his eyes sparkling with nostalgic memories, he takes a trip down memory lane, and what he recalls about his college days forms the main part of the story.

At the reunion, the friends are happy to see each other after eight long years. But they all seem to be weighed down by a tragic incident: Shakthi's death. Shiva remains the most melancholic of them all. All goes well until Shiva is found almost strangled to death. Everyone suspects Vasu, but Shakthi's father discovers that the murder was attempted by Shalini.

In a flashback, it is revealed that Shakthi and Shalini were lovers. In an ultimate twist, Shalini reveals that Shiva, who was running away from the police after breaking into an election booth, killed Shakthi with chloroform as the latter suffered from asthma. Shalini is upset that Shakthi's father prevented her from taking revenge against Shiva.

Shiva is cured and comes to seek an apology from Shakthi's father for accidentally killing Shakthi. Shakthi's father forgives Shiva and asks him to marry Meera, who has been waiting for him for over eight years. Vasu also comes to seek an apology from Shiva for all of his antics in college. Shakthi's parents adopt Shalini, whose family has died, and decide to take her home. The film ends as Shalini says farewell to her friends and to the image of Shakthi, who is forever present on the college campus.

The message of the film goes for all of us: "Never forget the sweet memories that happened in college."

Cast

 Prithviraj as Shiva
 Shakthi Vasu as Shakthi
 Karthik Kumar as Vasu
 Priyamani as Meera
 Anuja Iyer as Shalini
 Vishnu Priyan as Bala
 K. Bhagyaraj as Pazhaniyappan, Sakthi's father
 Manobala as Class Teacher
 Lollu Sabha Jeeva as Karthik
 Ilavarasu as Sethuraman
 Bava Lakshmanan as Subramani
 Srinath
 Boys Rajan as Principal
 Anjali Devi as Sakthi's mother
 Jayashree as Shalini's friend
 Kausha Rach in a Special Appearance in Song "Sexy Lady"

Production 
Writer G.N. Rangarajan's son Kumaravelan ventured into direction with this film. Kumaravelan modified the screenplay from the Malayalam original.

Soundtrack 

The soundtrack, composed by Vijay Antony, features seven songs with Azhagaai Pookkuthey and Pia Pia becoming big hits of the year.

Reception 
A critic from The Hindu wrote that "Kumaravelan’s screenplay bubbles with youthful spirit in the first half while the knots are unreeled in the second". A critic from The New Indian Express wrote that "Though it seems a watered-down version of the Malayalam film, Ninaithale Inikkum does offer a different viewing experience to the Tamil audiences". Critic R. Richard Mahesh wrote that "Finally, Ninaithale Inikkum is a poignant film that has a middling start and gradually brimmed with interesting moments". A critic from Rediff.com wrote that "The Tamil version doesn't exactly pull at your heart-strings like the Malayalam version seems to have done -- but it at least has a plot with all the loose ends tied up".

Box office

The film ran successfully.

References

2009 films
2000s Tamil-language films
2009 directorial debut films
Indian drama films
Tamil remakes of Malayalam films
Films scored by Vijay Antony
Indian buddy films
Films set in universities and colleges